Hanzala Shahid (also spelled Hanzala) is a Pakistani child actor who has appeared in 164 drama serials and Lollywood films.

He was a voice actor in 3 Bahadur and 3 Bahadur: The Revenge of Baba Balaam.

References

External links

Living people
Pakistani male child actors
Pakistani male film actors
Pakistani male television actors
Year of birth missing (living people)